South Australian Premier Cricket (previously known as South Australian District Cricket and South Australian Grade Cricket) is the semi-professional State league based in metropolitan Adelaide, South Australia. It is currently the highest level of cricket played in South Australia outside first-class cricket. The league is administered by the South Australian Cricket Association (SACA), which is the organisation responsible for promoting and developing the game of cricket in South Australia.

Competitions 
There are 13 clubs in the SACA Premier cricket competition. 

All clubs field four Mens senior teams and 12 of the clubs have four junior teams competing in regular weekend competitions.  Most clubs also field at least 1 Women's team in 1st and/or 2nd Grade Women's Cricket with some also fielding sides in the Adelaide Turf Cricket Association Women's Competition. Clubs have teams involved in various competitions including:
 West End Premier Cricket; Premium State cricket competition;
 Statewide Super Women's Premier Competition; Premier Women's cricket competition of 2 grades playing 50-over and T20 competitions;
 West End Cup; one-day competition;
 West End Twenty20 Cup, Twenty20 competition.
 U18 Shield; Under 18 one-day competition. Played on weekdays during the Summer school holidays.
 Under 16s, Reds (1st XI) and Whites (2nd XI) competition. Premium Underage competition;
 Under 14s, Reds (1st XI) and Whites (2nd XI) competition. Premium Youth Development competition;
 Ray Sutton Shield; Under 13s one-day competition, Premium Primary school competition.
 Under 12 Statewide Cup; Under 12 Twenty20 and One-Day Competition, All Grade Clubs Plus Two Country Teams; Country Red and Country Black

Premier Clubs 
Adelaide Cricket Club (Adelaide Buffalos)
East Torrens Cricket Club (Eastern Reds)
Glenelg Cricket Club (The Seahorses)
Kensington Cricket Club (The Browns)
Port Adelaide Cricket Club (Port Adelaide Magpies)
Prospect Cricket Club (The Pirates)
Northern Districts Cricket Club (The Jets)
Southern Districts Cricket Club (The Stingrays)
Sturt Cricket Club (The Blues) – formerly Unley CC
Tea Tree Gully Cricket Club (The Bulls)
Adelaide University Cricket Club (The Blacks)
West Torrens Cricket Club (Western Eagles) – formerly Hindmarsh CC
Woodville Cricket Club (The Peckers)

1st Grade Premierships 
The 1st Grade competition has been contested since the 1873–1874 season, and the "District", or electorate, club system since 1897–1898.  The following list shows the premiership side for each season.

Men's Premierships by Club

Top 5 Clubs by Men's Premierships

See also
Grade cricket for like competitions in other states

References

Sources
 Harte C. (1990) The History of the South Australian Cricket Association, Sports Marketing (Australia): Adelaide. .

External links 
 Official site

SA Grade Cricket Premiers (up to date)
http://premiercricket.sa.cricket.com.au/1st-Grade-Premierships.aspx?rw=c

Sport in Adelaide
Grade cricket competitions in Australia
Recurring sporting events established in 1873
1873 establishments in Australia
Sports leagues established in 1873
Cricket in South Australia